Juan Garaizabal (born 1971 in Madrid) is a Spanish plastic artist, Garaizabal's work encompasses drawings, sculpture, light and acoustic installations, video art, and engraving. According to the journal El País Garaizabal is one of the most internationally renowned Spanish artists. The most visible part of his works are his monumental public sculptures. His "Urban Memories" structures, intertwining sculpture and illumination, are a recuperation of long-lost architectural elements occupying vacant, historical sites.

Artistic history
Initially a  conceptual artist, a large part of his work has been done by hand, using such techniques as forging, carpentry, electricity, plasticity, and masonry – all skills acquired through time and experimentation. As of 2008, his main studio is in Berlin, Germany, although he maintains another in Madrid, Spain and a third one in Miami, United States.

Public installations

2006: Bosque de Flores, Valencia, Spain.
2007: Memoria Urbana Bucharest, Uranus Area. Noaptea Alba, Romania.
2011: Archives Stairway. Private collection. Connecticut, United States.
2012: Memoria Urbana Berlin, Germany.
2013: Memoria del Giardino Venice, Italy. Curated by Barbara Rose.
2016: Memoria Urbana Miami; Havana's Balcony, United States of America.

2018: Memoria Urbana Segovia Hay Festival

References

External links

 Official Web Site
 Berliner Morgenpost
 Huffington Post
 Miami Times  
 Artnet
 Televisa News

1971 births
Living people
Conceptual artists
Light artists
Spanish contemporary artists
Contemporary sculptors
20th-century Spanish sculptors
20th-century Spanish male artists
Spanish male sculptors
Artists from the Community of Madrid